Karen Boswall is an independent film maker, known for documentaries that she made while living and working in Mozambique between 1993 and 2007. She is a part-time lecturer in Visual Anthropology at the University of Kent. Her films cover a range of subjects that include marine conservation, popular music, women & HIV and peace and reconciliation.

Career and work
Before going to Mozambique, Boswall had her own production company in Britain. She has worked around the world as a sound recordist, producer and director. In Mozambique she produced many radio features for the BBC World Service.
In 1999 she returned to directing TV documentaries with Living Battles (1998) and From the Ashes (1999), both concerning the recently ended civil war. Dancing on the Edge (2001) is a movie about the risks facing a young woman coming of age in Mozambique where poverty and traditional practices increase the risk of acquiring HIV/AIDS.
It is the first made by Catembe Productions, her own production company, which produces educational and children's program.

Boswall's 2004 Marrabenta Stories documents young Mozambican musicians who play jazz, funk and hip-hop joining older men who play the more traditional Marrabenta dance music on a tour of South Africa. 
Research into a joint project with Jose Eduardo Agualusa to make a film with a strong element of music about the situation of women in the cone of southern Africa, to be called "My Father's Wives", became the basis for a 2008 book by that name by Agualusa. 
The book may be seen as the script for the projected film.

Filmography

References

External links
 Karen Boswall

Living people
English anthropologists
English documentary filmmakers
English women film directors
Mozambican film directors
Academics of the University of Kent
Place of birth missing (living people)
Year of birth missing (living people)
Women documentary filmmakers
Mozambican women film directors